The Enterprise was a Via Rail train which operated overnight between Montreal and Toronto in Canada. Since the trip took only five hours, the train would stop en route, allowing the train's departure to be in the evening and its arrival in the morning. In 2002, the Enterprise was the first Via train to use the new Renaissance cars. The Enterprise was discontinued in October 2005 and replaced by an early morning trip on the truncated Kingston–Toronto segment.

References 
 Via Rail an astounding history
 Farewell to VIA's Enterprise trip

2000 establishments in Ontario
2000 establishments in Quebec
2005 disestablishments in Ontario
2005 disestablishments in Quebec
Former Via Rail routes
Named passenger trains of Ontario
Night trains of Canada
Passenger rail transport in Quebec
Railway services discontinued in 2005
Railway services introduced in 2000